Annaburg-Prettin was a Verwaltungsgemeinschaft ("administrative community") in the district of Wittenberg, in Saxony-Anhalt, Germany. It was situated on the right bank of the Elbe, southeast of Wittenberg. The seat of the Verwaltungsgemeinschaft was in Annaburg. It was disbanded in January 2011.

The Verwaltungsgemeinschaft of Annaburg-Prettin consisted of the following municipalities (population in 2005 in brackets):

Annaburg * (3,762) 
Axien (592) 
Bethau (190) 
Groß Naundorf (779) 
Labrun (130) 
Lebien (375) 
Plossig (279) 
Prettin (2,114)

References

Former Verwaltungsgemeinschaften in Saxony-Anhalt